Söråker is a locality situated in Timrå Municipality, Västernorrland County, Sweden with 2,312 inhabitants in 2010.

Sports
The following sports clubs are located in Söråker:

 Söråkers FF

References 

Populated places in Timrå Municipality
Medelpad